Castanopsis clemensii is a tree in the family Fagaceae. It is named for the American chaplain and plant collector Joseph Clemens.

Description
The yellowish white bark is smooth or cracked or lenticellate.

Distribution and habitat
Castanopsis clemensii is endemic to Borneo. Its habitat is lower montane forests up to  altitude.

References

clemensii
Endemic flora of Borneo
Trees of Borneo
Plants described in 1968
Flora of the Borneo montane rain forests